Lai Chu-en (born 23 July 1996) is a Taiwanese boxer. He competed in the men's lightweight competition at the 2016 Summer Olympics.

Lai was born in Pingtung County, and is of Paiwan ethnicity. His parents separated before he was born, leaving his mother to support him and his elder brother alone through her job as a nurse. He did not do well at school, and describes himself as having no direction in life until his decision to join the track team while in middle school. He later took up boxing, and was admitted to the National Taiwan University of Physical Education and Sport.

References

1996 births
Living people
Taiwanese male boxers
Olympic boxers of Taiwan
Boxers at the 2016 Summer Olympics
Paiwan people
People from Pingtung County
Boxers at the 2018 Asian Games
Asian Games competitors for Chinese Taipei
Lightweight boxers
21st-century Taiwanese people